"Walking Down Canal Street" is a drinking song from Roaring Twenties New York, describing Canal Street.

There are variations and additional impromptu verses.

Max Hunter collected a version of this song from Charles Varley on January 19, 1967, in Hope, Arkansas (See here).  This recording is now on the Southern Missouri State University website online archive of the Max Hunter Collection.

In 2015, the rugby team at the University of Mary Washington was dissolved indefinitely after a recording of team members singing a version of the song was publicized.

Lyrics 

Each line is usually first sung by the lead singer, then repeated by the group.

References

Sources
Randolf, Vance and G. Legman (editor). Roll Me In Your Arms.  "Walking Down Canal Street" on pg. 561.
Doug Clark and the Hot Nuts.  Rush Week [LP]. ND (ca 1965). Song is titled "Canal Street".

Drinking songs
Songs about prostitutes
Songs about New York City
Songs about diseases and disorders
Songs about pregnancy
Year of song unknown
Songwriter unknown